Jamkhed is a census town in Ahmednagar district in the Indian state of Maharashtra. Jamkhed is in between the Ahmednagar and Beed. Jamkhed is very well known for its comprehensive rural health project CRHP. It also has Jamkhed homeopathic college, nursing college.

Geography
It has an average elevation of 590 metres (1935 feet).

Demographics
 India census, Jamkhed had a population of 34,017. Males constituted 52.7% of the population and females 47.3%. Jamkhed had an average literacy rate of 69%, higher than the national average of 59.5%: male literacy was 76%, and female literacy was 63%. In Jamkhed, 14% of the population was under 6 years of age.

References

External links
 The Comprehensive Rural Health Project, Jamkhed website

Villages in Ahmednagar district